This is a list of notable savoury puddings, defined as a savoury dish consisting of various ingredients baked, steamed, or boiled into a solid mass.

Puddings

See also

 List of sweet puddings

Savoury puddings